Ordon may refer to:
 Juliusz Konstanty Ordon, a Polish rebel
 Ordo (palace), a Mongolian mobile palace